Rhagium mordax, the black-spotted longhorn beetle, is a species of long-horned beetle. This beetle is found throughout Europe and to Kazakhstan and Russia. Larvae develop in silver fir, hazel, European weeping birch, European beech, and the European chestnut. Ischnoceros rusticus is an ichneumonid parasitoid wasp that feds on Rhagium mordax larvae.

Subtaxa 
There are five formally described varieties:
 Rhagium mordax var. altajense Plavilstshikov, 1915 
 Rhagium mordax var. klenkai Heyrovský, 1914 
 Rhagium mordax var. mediofasciatum Plavilstshikov, 1936 
 Rhagium mordax var. morvandicum Pic, 1927 
 Rhagium mordax var. subdilatatum Pic, 1917

References

Lepturinae
Beetles described in 1775
Taxa named by Charles De Geer